The Women's 500 m time trial event of the 2016 UCI Track Cycling World Championships was held on 4 March 2016. Anastasia Voynova of Russia won the gold medal.

Results
The race was started at 14:30.

References

Women's 500 m time trial
UCI Track Cycling World Championships – Women's 500 m time trial